In Tarry v Ashton (1876) 1 QBD 314, an important case in English tort law.

Facts
A lamp that the defendant had employed an independent contractor to repair was not securely fastened to the wall of the defendant's house. It fell on a passer-by.

Judgment
Finding the defendant to be liable, Lord Blackman said the following:

See also 
 Law of agency
 Delict

Notes

References 
 Tarry v Ashton (1876) 1 QBD 314.

English tort case law
1876 in case law
1876 in British law